Richard Barclay Surrick (born 1937) is a senior United States district judge of the United States District Court for the Eastern District of Pennsylvania.

Education and career

Born in Media, Pennsylvania Surrick received a Bachelor of Arts degree from Dickinson College in 1960, and a Juris Doctor from Pennsylvania State University - Dickinson Law in 1965. He was also initiated as a member of the Raven's Claw Society. He was in private practice in Pennsylvania from 1965 to 1977. He was a chief of the appellate division in the Office of the Public Defender of Delaware County, from 1965 to 1974. He was a judge on the Court of Common Pleas of Delaware County from 1978 to 2000. He received a Master of Laws from the University of Virginia School of Law in 1982.

Federal judicial service

On April 11, 2000, Surrick was nominated by President Bill Clinton to a seat on the United States District Court for the Eastern District of Pennsylvania vacated by Lowell A. Reed, Jr. Surrick was confirmed by the United States Senate on May 24, 2000, and received his commission on June 5, 2000. He assumed senior status on February 1, 2011.

Sources

1937 births
Dickinson College alumni
Judges of the United States District Court for the Eastern District of Pennsylvania
Living people
Public defenders
United States district court judges appointed by Bill Clinton
Dickinson School of Law alumni
University of Virginia School of Law alumni
20th-century American judges
People from Media, Pennsylvania
21st-century American judges